Youth Taking Action (YTA), is a California registered non-profit organization promoting youth involvement in philanthropy. Launched in summer 2003, its comprehensive online portal allows teenagers worldwide to participate in programs that aren't based on the typical, 'time-consuming', model of volunteering.   Over the past few years, YTA has gained much recognition as it is completely managed by a group of student representatives across the United States, Canada, and India.

The idea for the venture started when the founding students were in middle school. Inspired after reading a biography about Craig Kielburger, a 12-year-old Canadian who started his own crusade against child-labor, the students decided to do something similar.  After much struggle in development and construction, YTA now hosts two programs intended to spread awareness about various prevailing social issues.

More recently, YTA has received seed funding from a nonprofit organization, Youth Venture.  The Ashoka Foundation launched Youth Venture in 1996 in the U.S. with the vision that everyone in society could take initiative and address social needs, rather than looking to the elite few who lead today.  Youth Venture currently supports hundreds of youth groups by offering seed funding, guidance, tools and support.

Programs
YTA's online website hosts two main programs which are completely Internet based - thus not require very little effort and time from to participate in.

The Share & Care Club encourages teenagers to forgo a soda or a pack of gum every month, in essence, save just one dollar from his/her pocket money every month.  A group of five participants would effectively raise $60 at the end of a year.  Though it may not seem like a large amount, participants can forward funds to YTA select organizations that can make a huge impact.  For example, each year 350,000 kids go blind due to lack of Vitamin A.  Just one dollar can provide enough supplement capsules to protect 4 children from developing blindness.

The Birthday Club promotes kids to donate just 1 present on their birthday - make their special day, a special day for many others as well.  Birthday kids can set up their parties through the YTA website and invite/request invitees to participate in the program.  Only the first 'x' invitees that opt to donate online, in lieu of bringing a present, will receive a special certificate that they can bring to the party.  In the end, the birthday person gets to forward the funds raised to a cause and country of his/her choice.

References

Related links
 
 iCauseImpact.org
 

Non-profit organizations based in California